Cymindis semisulcata is a species of ground beetle in the subfamily Harpalinae. It was described by G. Horn in 1881.

References

semisulcata
Beetles described in 1881